The North Dakota Fighting Sioux women's ice hockey team was the college ice hockey team at the Grand Forks campus of the University of North Dakota. They were members of the Western Collegiate Hockey Association (WCHA) and competed in National Collegiate Athletic Association (NCAA) Division I women ice hockey.

The program was cut by the University of North Dakota on March 29, 2017.

History
On October 5, 2010, North Dakota was ranked 10th in the Uscho.com poll. It was only the second time in program history that the club was in the top 10 in either the USA Today or Uscho.com poll. The last time came during the 2008–09 season after a 7–2–1 start. On October 23, 2010, Jocelyne Lamoureux had a hat trick and one assist. In addition, one of her goals was the game-winning goal. The hat trick was the first by a North Dakota player since Cami Wooster in 2005. On February 25–27, North Dakota participated in its first WCHA First Round Home Playoff Series, vs. Bemidji State at Fido Purpur Arena. On February 27, the Sioux advanced to their first WCHA Final Face-off berth winning an overtime thriller 3–2 in OT with a goal by Monique Lamoureux.

In its WCHA home opener on October 21, 2011, the top line of the Fighting Sioux combined for thirteen points as they bested the Ohio State Buckeyes by an 11–1 margin. Monique Lamoureux-Kolls tied a North Dakota record with a 5-point game. In the contest, 13 different Sioux skaters registered at least one point. Michelle Karvinen scored a hat trick and logged one assist for four points. In addition, Josefine Jakobsen and Jocelyne Lamoureux each had 4-point games. Several program records were broken in the game including: most goals scored in a game (11), largest margin of victory (10), and largest margin of victory over a conference opponent (10).

On March 29, 2017, the University of North Dakota announced it was cutting women's hockey – along with men's and women's swimming and diving – to meet a mandated $1.3M reduction in the athletics department budget that was part of a university-wide budget cut. Following the decision to drop the program, 11 ex-UND players filed a complaint claiming that dropping the program violated Title IX guidelines. The U.S. Department of Education's Office for Civil Rights dismissed two discrimination complaints related to the decision and on June 20, 2019, a U.S. District Court judge dismissed a lawsuit against the school brought on similar grounds.

Year by Year

Head coaches

Records vs. WCHA opponents

Olympians
 Michelle Karvinen
 Anna Kilponen
 Emma Nuutinen
 Vilma Tanskanen
 Susanna Tapani
 Tanja Eisenschmid
 Susanne Fellner
 Jocelyne Lamoureux
 Monique Lamoureux
 Johanna Fällman

Fighting Hawks in professional hockey

Awards and honors
Shelby Amsley-Benzie, 2014–15 and 2015–16 WCHA Outstanding Student-Athlete of the Year, 2014–15 WCHA Goaltending Champion, 2014–15 All-WCHA First Team
Casie Hanson, 2007–08 WCHA Outstanding Student-Athlete of the Year
Michelle Karvinen, 2011–12 WCHA Rookie of the Year
Jocelyne Lamoureux, 2011–12 and 2012–13 WCHA Outstanding Student-Athlete of the Year, 2011–12 WCHA Scoring Champion

References

 
Ice hockey teams in North Dakota
Defunct sports teams in North Dakota